Năstase is a common Romanian family name which may refer to one of the following persons:

Adrian Năstase, Romanian politician
Andrei Năstase, Moldovan activist and politician
Horațiu Năstase, physicist
Ilie Năstase (born 1946), retired tennis player
Liliana Năstase, athlete
Valentin Năstase, football player

and to:

 Năstase, a village in Mihălăşeni Commune, Botoşani County

Romanian-language surnames